Cardinal Industries, Inc. was a corporation headquartered in Columbus, Ohio, United States.  Established in 1954, it produced manufactured housing, including thousands of apartments in the United States.  These one-story apartments were assembled on-site from  modules.  It also began the Knights Inn motel chain.

Key people
Austin Guirlinger, president and CEO
Larry Rosenthal, vice president of apartment products
David J. Baker, vice president

Apartments
Cardinal apartments can be found in a few different configurations, depending partly on the number of 12' x 24' modules used.  One-module apartments are advertised as efficiency or studio apartments.  Some have murphy beds.  Two-modules have one bedroom, with some models containing a utility room with washer and dryer connections.  Three-modules have two bedrooms.  Some contain two equally sized bedrooms, while others have a master bedroom instead.  Most have washer and dryer connections.  In addition to the ground floor living area, many offer attic space over one of the modules.

Most of the apartments were built in the 1970s and 1980s.  The corporation filed for bankruptcy in 1989, and reorganized as Cardinal Realty Services, Inc., a real estate ownership and management company.  Cardinal Realty Services, Inc. was listed on the New York Stock Exchange [CRSI] before merging with Equity Residential.  Ownership of many properties transferred to Equity Residential.
Today many of the properties are managed by Elon Property Management.

Example apartment communities
Bridge Point, Jacksonville, Florida
Cardinal Village, Sewell, New Jersey  Cardinal Village
Glenwood Village, Macon, Georgia
Slate Run, Indianapolis, Indiana
Longwood, Lexington, Kentucky
Annhurst, Belcamp, Maryland
Wentworth, Roseville, Michigan
Dartmouth Place, Kent, Ohio
Millburn, Stow, Ohio
Pinewood Apartments, Kent, Ohio (not owned by Empirian) 
Bellflower Apartments, Lebanon, Ohio (owned by Central Management)
Woodlands Apartments, Columbus, Ohio www.woodlandsohiobyelon.com
Retreat at Indian Lake, Hendersonville, Tennessee
Pinewood Village Apartments, Chattanooga, Tennessee (Owned by Beverly, LLC) 
Lakeshore II Apartments, Fort Oglethorpe, Georgia

References

External links
Elon Property Management
OSHRC Docket 82-0427 SECRETARY OF LABOR, Complainant, v CARDINAL INDUSTRIES, INC., Respondent.

Construction and civil engineering companies of the United States
Companies based in the Columbus, Ohio metropolitan area
Construction and civil engineering companies established in 1954
1954 establishments in Africa